Miguel Guedes (born 10 May 1972, in Porto) is a Portuguese musician, songwriter, singer, and the frontman member of Portuguese band Blind Zero. He is also a lawyer, and has a column where he talks about politics on the Portuguese journal "Jornal de Notícias". He is an employee of the GDA - Cooperativa de Gestão dos Direitos dos Artistas Intérpretes ou Executantes, dealing with related rights issues. Miguel appears on a weekly RTP programme, "Trio D'Ataque" where he talks about football. Miguel graduated in law by the University of Coimbra.

References

21st-century Portuguese male singers
Portuguese songwriters
Male songwriters
Portuguese musicians
1972 births
Musicians from Porto
University of Coimbra alumni
Living people